Eleutherodactylus atkinsi is a species of frog in the family Eleutherodactylidae endemic to Cuba.  Its natural habitats are dry forests, moist forests, moist shrubland, flooded grasslands and savannas, swamps, caves, arable land, pastures, plantations, rural gardens, urban areas, heavily degraded former forests, irrigated land, seasonally flooded agricultural land, and canals and ditches.

References

atkinsi
Endemic fauna of Cuba
Amphibians of Cuba
Amphibians described in 1925
Taxonomy articles created by Polbot